Erik Nielsen Whitehorse International Airport  is an airport of entry located in Whitehorse, Yukon, Canada. It is part of the National Airports System, and is owned and operated by the Government of Yukon. The airport was renamed in honour of longtime Yukon Member of Parliament Erik Nielsen on December 15, 2008. The terminal handled 294,000 passengers in 2012, representing a 94% increase in passenger traffic since 2002. By 2017, this number had risen to 366,000. Air North is based in Whitehorse.

History

Development
In spring 1920, preparation for the arrival of the US Army Black Wolf Squadron (4 US DeHavilland DH-4s) began on Cyr's wood lot on the hill above Whitehorse.  The area was cleared for a landing strip.  This landing strip was used by Treadwell Mining and Yukon Airways and Exploration Co. in the mid/late 1920s.

Expanded between 1940 and 1941 by the federal Department of Transport, it was transferred to the Royal Canadian Air Force (RCAF) in 1942 as part of the Northwest Staging Route under the name of RCAF Station Whitehorse. It was closed in 1968 and the airfield resumed its status as a civilian airport.

The airport is classified as an airport of entry by Nav Canada and is staffed by the Canada Border Services Agency (CBSA). CBSA officers at this airport can handle aircraft with no more than 50 passengers; however, they can handle up to 225 if the aircraft is unloaded in stages.

The airport has two fixed-base operators for fuel, limited aircraft maintenance facilities. The control tower operates from 7 a.m. – 9 p.m. local time, and the Whitehorse Flight Service Station provides Airport Advisory Service during the remaining hours. ARFF services are also provided 24 hours a day, 7 days a week.

In addition to scheduled commercial service, numerous small air charter operators and bush pilots use the airport and it serves as a major base for water bombers used in forest firefighting operations. The airport also controls Whitehorse Water Aerodrome, a float plane base on Schwatka Lake.

The airport gained a nonstop transatlantic flight in May 1998, when an Air Transat Lockheed L-1011 landed from Frankfurt with German tourists aboard. By the summer of 2000, three airlines were flying between Whitehorse and Europe; Condor and Balair had inaugurated services to Frankfurt and Zürich, respectively. However, Air Transat's route to Germany did not return after this season. 

During the September 11 attacks, two aircraft approaching the United States from Asia were diverted to Whitehorse as part of Operation Yellow Ribbon.  One of these flights, a Boeing 747 operating as Korean Air Flight 85, was feared to be hijacked; this was not the case as the jumbo jet was low on fuel. Many of the buildings in the downtown area near the airport were evacuated as a precaution. Those who witnessed the landing by the Korean Air 747 observed the Royal Canadian Mounted Police (RCMP) order the flight crew out at gunpoint. Meanwhile, the economic impact of the attacks contributed to Balair's collapse, so the link to Switzerland ended.

The airport's parking lot is graced by an old Canadian Pacific Air Lines Douglas DC-3 on a pedestal that serves as a weather vane.

Historical airline service
Commencing in the early 1940s, scheduled passenger service was operated by Canadian Pacific Air Lines.  Canadian Pacific and its successor, CP Air, provided service to Vancouver, British Columbia; Edmonton, Alberta; Prince George, British Columbia; Fort St. John, British Columbia; Fort Nelson, British Columbia and Watson Lake, Yukon.  Other destinations in the Yukon as well as Fairbanks, Alaska were also served by Canadian Pacific during the mid-1940s with these flights subsequently being discontinued.  CP Air served Whitehorse during the 1970s with Boeing 737-200 jetliners with direct, no change of plane flights to all of the above named destinations in Canada.  Other Canadian Pacific flights into the airport over the years were earlier operated with such twin engine prop aircraft as the Lockheed Model 18 Lodestar, Douglas DC-3, Convair 240, and also with larger, four engine Douglas DC-4 and DC-6B prop aircraft as well as Bristol Britannia turboprops.  CP Air was subsequently acquired by Pacific Western Airlines with the combined air carriers then operating as Canadian Airlines International which in turn continued to serve Whitehorse with Boeing 737 jet service into the 1990s before this air carrier was acquired by Air Canada in 2000.  Pacific Western had previously served the airport with nonstop Boeing 737-200 jet service to Edmonton, Prince George (with this flight continuing on to Vancouver) and Yellowknife, NWT (with this flight continuing on to Winnipeg) operated at various times during the early and mid 1980s.  During the mid and late 1970s, the airport was also served by Winnipeg-based Transair (Canada) which operated Boeing 737-200 and Fokker F28 twin jet service direct to Winnipeg several days a week via intermediate stops at Yellowknife and Churchill, Manitoba. Transair was also subsequently acquired by Pacific Western Airlines.  Another air carrier which served Whitehorse during the early and mid 1970s was International Jetair operating nonstop flights to Inuvik on the weekdays with continuing one stop service several days a week to Fort Nelson flown with Lockheed L-188 Electra turboprop aircraft.

U.S.-based Pan American World Airways (Pan Am) served Whitehorse during the early 1960s as part of a route linking Seattle with Alaska.  Pan Am operated Douglas DC-4 followed by Douglas DC-6B propliners into the airport on a routing of Seattle-Ketchikan-Juneau-Whitehorse-Fairbanks-Galena-Nome.

Several Alaska-based airlines also served Whitehorse in the past.  During the 1970s, Wien Air Alaska operated Boeing 737-200 jetliners as well as Fairchild F-27 turboprops into the airport with Anchorage-Fairbanks-Whitehorse-Juneau routings.  Era Aviation operated Convair 580 turboprop aircraft nonstop between Anchorage and Whitehorse during the 1980s.

Facilities

The airport has its own fire department with three crash tenders and one supervisor vehicle based at a fire station on the airport grounds.

Airlines and destinations

See also
Whitehorse/Cousins Airport

References

External links

 Government of Yukon - Whitehorse International Airport
 CF-CPY Wind Vane
 Whitehorse Airport Arrivals
 Whitehorse Airport Departures
 Page about this airport on COPA's Places to Fly airport directory

Certified airports in Yukon
Transport in Whitehorse
Airfields of the United States Army Air Forces Air Transport Command in Alaska
Airfields of the United States Army Air Forces in Canada
National Airports System
Airports established in 1941
1941 establishments in Canada